Kelsian Group, formerly SeaLink Travel Group, is an Australian public company that operates transport services in Australia, United Kingdom and Singapore.

History
In 1989, the business was founded with the purchase of the Kangaroo Island SeaLink business. In 2004, it purchased Subritzky Ferries in Auckland. This was sold in 2011.

In 2011, the business of Captain Cook Cruises (including the previously taken over Matilda Cruises), Murray River Cruises and Sunferries Townsville was purchased. The Townsville operation was rebranded Sealink.

SeaLink has also diversified, purchasing specialist travel companies, managing the Adelaide Central bus station, operating the SkyLink Adelaide Airport Shuttle Service and a coach operation. In September 2013, SeaLink commenced a ferry operation in Darwin.

In October 2013, SeaLink was floated on the Australian Securities Exchange.

In November 2015, SeaLink acquired Transit Systems marine operations, which includes:
Bay Islands Transit ferry operation in Brisbane,
Gladstone Ferries,
Stradbroke Ferries operation in Brisbane.

In February 2016, the Captain Cook Cruises Western Australia business was purchased.

In October 2019, the company announced the acquisition of the remaining business of Transit Systems for $635 million. As part of the transaction, Sealink's CEO, Jeff Ellison, stepped down, to be replaced by Transit Systems' CEO, Clint Feuerherdt, who took a 2.6% shareholding of the enlarged SeaLink. Transit System's co-founder and chairman Neil Smith joined the SeaLink Board of Directors as a non-executive director and also took up 15.3% shareholding of the company. The deal was completed in January 2020.

On 4 November 2020, RiverCity Ferries took over the operation of Brisbane City Council's CityCat, CityHopper and Cross River Ferry networks from Transdev Brisbane Ferries.

In September 2021, SeaLink Travel Group and the RATP Group announced that their respective London bus operations (including London United, London Sovereign and Tower Transit's Westbourne Park garage) would merge into a new joint venture called RATP Dev Transit London, with RATP Dev holding 87.5% and Tower Transit holding 12.5%. The incorporation of the joint venture was finalised on 11 December 2021. Tower Transit's Lea Interchange garage, located in East London, was not part of the joint venture and remained unaffected until sold to Stagecoach London in June 2022.

In November 2021, SeaLink Travel Group was rebranded Kelsian Group. "Kelsian" is an anagram of "SeaLink".

In September 2022, the Kelsian Group acquired the operations of the HCT Group's Channel Islands-based LibertyBus and buses.gg operations, located on the islands of Jersey and Guernsey respectively.

References

Bus companies of South Australia
Companies based in Adelaide
Companies listed on the Australian Securities Exchange
Ferry companies of Australia
Kelsian Group
Transport companies established in 1989
1989 establishments in Australia